The fauna of Nicaragua is characterized by a very high level of biodiversity. Much of Nicaragua's wildlife lives in protected areas.

These protected areas encompass a wide variety of habitats, including rainforests, lakes, mountains, and volcanoes throughout the country.

Mammals

Nicaragua is home to several species of New World monkeys, including the Geoffroy's spider monkey, which is currently listed by the International Union for Conservation of Nature (IUCN) as an endangered species. The jaguar is the largest felid that is indigenous to Nicaragua. Other species include the cougar, jaguarundi, margay, and ocelot. There are a number of unusual mammals found in Nicaragua, including the three-toed sloth, northern tamandua (lesser anteater), and two species of armadillo.

Birds

The birds of Nicaragua includes a total of 698 species. Eight of these species, including the golden-cheeked warbler (Dendroica chrysoparia) and the great green macaw (Ara ambigua), are currently listed by the IUCN as threatened species.

Many of Nicaragua's birds are brilliantly colored, including various species of parrots, toucans, trogons, and hummingbirds. Lesson's motmot is the national bird of Nicaragua. Natural range for the scarlet macaw has been vastly reduced by the pet trade. Most of the Pacific region of Nicaragua no longer is inhabited by the species.

Reptiles

Nicaragua is home to many nesting populations of sea turtles, including the hawksbill sea turtle, leatherback sea turtle, loggerhead sea turtle, olive ridley sea turtle, and the Pacific green turtle (Chelonia mydas agassisi). All of these are endangered or critically endangered species, with declining global populations. Extensive efforts are currently underway to preserve them as much as possible. The country also harbors a large diversity of terrestrial snake and lizard species, and is home to the spectacled caiman and American crocodile.

Fish

The bull shark is a species of shark that can survive for an extended period of time in fresh water. It can be found in Lake Nicaragua and the San Juan River, where it is often referred to as the "Nicaragua shark". Nicaragua has recently banned freshwater fishing of the Nicaragua shark and the sawfish in response to the declining populations of these animals.

The Midas cichlid, native to the San Juan River basin in Nicaragua and Costar Rica, is now recognized as a species complex with dozens of species, most or all of them inhabiting extremely reduced ranges. Five species from a Lake Apoyo, a volcanic crater lake, have been described recently.

Invertebrates

Molluscs

Many species of molluscs are indigenous to Nicaragua, including at least 79 species of terrestrial snails and slugs.

Protected areas

These include wildlife refuges and nature reserves that shelter a wide range of ecosystems. There are more than 1,400 animal species classified thus far in Nicaragua. Some 12,000 species of plants have been classified thus far in Nicaragua, with an estimated 5,000 species not yet classified.

See also

 List of amphibians of Nicaragua
 Flora of Nicaragua
 Ministry of the Environment and Natural Resources (MARENA)

General:
 :Category:IUCN Red List critically endangered species
 IUCN Red List Critically Endangered species (Animalia)

References

External links
 Nicaragua.com on Wildlife
 underwatertimes.com Article on endangered shark in Nicaragua.
 WCS Adopt-a-turtle fund
 CentralAmerica.com  Information about National Parks
 More info on reserves
  Wildlife of Laguna de Apoyo Nature Reserve, Nicaragua
 Illegal Traffic in Scarlet Macaws

 
Environment of Nicaragua